Terres Inovia is a French agricultural research institute carrying out applied research on oilseed plants and protein crop. It was created in June, 2015 by merging:
 the CETIOM, the French research institute on oilseed crops;
 the UNIP, the French research institute on protein crops.

Terres Inovia main tasks are to conduct research and to disseminate technical knowledge to farmers. It has partnerships with other French research institutes such as INRA and Arvalis Institut du Végétal; also, it participates to European research projects (e.g. the Feed-a-Gene project).
The crops studied are:
 oilseed crops:
 rapeseed
 sunflower
 soybean
 flax (especially for production of linseed oil)
 protein crops:
 pea
 faba bean
 lupin
 hemp.

References 

Agricultural research institutes in France